Erzsébetváros (both names meaning Elizabethtown) is the 7th district of Budapest, situated on the Pest side of the Danube. The inner half of the district was the historic Jewish quarter of Pest. The Dohány Street Synagogue, the largest functioning synagogue in Europe, is located in this district. Currently it is the most densely populated district of Budapest with 29,681.3 person per km2. In 1910 Erzsébetváros had 152,454 inhabitants. During the socialist era Erzsébetváros's population decreased rapidly, because young people and families moved to the newer "panelized" boom districts (Újpest, Újbuda, Óbuda, Kispest etc.). Gentrification and recovery started in the middle of the 2000s.

Name 
Erzsébetváros was named on 17 January 1882 after Queen Elisabeth (a.k.a. "The Empress Sissi"), the popular consort of Emperor of Austria and King of Hungary Franz Joseph I of the Habsburg Empire.
Until the unification of Budapest in 1873 this area was part of Terézváros. Between 1873 and 1882 it was named District VII without name.

Politics 
The current mayor of VII. District of Budapest is Péter Niedermüller (DK).

The District Assembly, elected at the 2019 local government elections, is made up of 15 members (1 Mayor, 10 Individual constituencies MEPs and 4 Compensation List MEPs) divided into this political parties and alliances:

List of mayors

Twin towns 
Erzsébetváros is twinned with:
  Sveti Vlas, Bulgaria
  Požega, Croatia
  Nevers, France
  Stavroupoli, Thessaloniki, Greece
  Siedlce, Poland
  Dolný Kubín, Slovakia
  Stari Grad of Belgrade, Serbia
  Karlovac, Croatia
  Safed, Israel
  Comrat, Moldova

See also 
Gozsdu-udvar
 List of districts in Budapest

Gallery

Notes

References

External links
 Aerial photographs of Erzsébetváros
 The old jewish quarter of Pest